Kim Shin-rok (born 1981) is a South Korean actress. She gained recognition for her supporting roles in 2021 television series Beyond Evil, Hellbound, and One Ordinary Day.

Education 
After graduating from the Department of Geography at Seoul National University, she obtained a Master of Arts in Theater and Film at the Graduate School of Hanyang University. She later earned a Bachelor of Arts in acting from the Korean Academy of Arts and Sciences.

Filmography

Film

Television series

Web series

Theater

Awards and nominations

References

External links 
 Official website
 
 

21st-century South Korean actresses
South Korean stage actresses
South Korean film actresses
South Korean television actresses
South Korean web series actresses
1981 births
Living people
Seoul National University alumni
Hanyang University alumni